Blue Guitars is the twenty-first studio album by British singer-songwriter Chris Rea, released on 14 October 2005 by his independent record label Jazzee Blue and Edel Records. The Blue Guitars album, packaged as a box set in the style of an earbook, consists of eleven CDs, one DVD and a full colour book, including paintings by the artist, liner notes and song lyrics. It is an ambitious project about blues music with the 137 songs recorded over the course of 18 months with a work schedule - according to Chris Rea himself - of twelve hours a day, seven days a week. 2007 saw the release of a 2 CD "best of" compilation Blue Guitars: A Collection of Songs, which with individual albums can be also found in digital format.

Initially the project was inspired by Bill Wyman's Blues Odyssey and can be called an "odyssey" in its own right, for depicting a journey through the various epochs of blues music, starting at its African origins, then going through various American regional variations, different styles including Celtic & Irish and finishing with modern-time blues from the 1960s and 1970s.

According to De Standaards review, it should be considered as Rea's "magnum opus". The earbook album sold over 150,000 copies in Europe, and 170,000 until 2017. Several live exhibitions of the album's artwork paintings were held, like in October 2005 at The Cork Street Gallery, Central London, England, and Spazio Oikos, Milan, Italy.

 Summary 
The eleven separate records which compose "Blue Guitars" could as well stand on their own; in combination, however, they provide a journey through the different epochs of the Blues, showing the various components that have been added to the original African Blues over time, the changes in instrumentation, style, lyrical expression and thematic implications. Thereby Chris Rea and his band imitate the various styles and lyrical topics, creating an instantly recognizable atmosphere on each record, with the first few songs usually setting up the direction in which the record is going and then developing to various styles within the field of each record.

Initially 16 CDs were planned, but Rea noted his initial idea was too intellectual and did not intend for the work to be seen as an academic work, yet as a story. He noted that it's not meant to be played in one day, neither songs separately, as far the thread can be followed, but nevertheless it should be enjoyed in the prolonged period of time. He also expressed concern about the digitalization of modern generations whose musical perception lacks the attitude for making the record listening a specific enjoyable experience.

For each of the albums were studied their history and characteristics, and for the recording process and sessions in the studio were procured and used equipments which was used at the specific time, and the studio itself was set up in the way to best-possibly convey the sound of rooms of the previous times.

 Blue Guitars I – Beginnings 
The first album of this set deals with the very beginnings of the Blues, tracing its ways back to its African roots. Living conditions were hard, many African natives were taken captives and transported across the ocean to be sold as slaves, sometimes even betrayed by their own people, which is vividly depicted in the song "The King Who Sold His Own". All in all it was an environment, where it was only natural for the Blues to develop, and even though the instrumentation and the construction of the songs was still very different from what we now know as Blues, the basics were already there: the sadness, the strain, the burdens, the depression, the feeling of "blue" and – of course – the underlying musical structure.
Track list:
West Africa – 4.14
Cry for Home – 4.58
The King Who Sold his Own – 5.18
White Man Coming – 4.01
Where The Blues Come From – 6.18
Lord Tell Me It Won't Be Long – 4.58
Work Gang – 4.32
Praise The Lord – 4.41
Sweet Sunday – 5.38
Sing Out The Devil – 6.08
Boss Man Cut My Chains – 3.21

 Blue Guitars II – Country Blues 
Country Blues was the natural development, the original Blues would go, once it had arrived in the American South: it was a dark time, a time of fear, people had to work hard during slavery, even harder after they had been released, wandering around unemployed, aimlessly. Racism and KKK made the situation even worse, which reflected in the music, instrumentation gradually changed and the lyrics told stories of fear (KKK Blues), aimless wandering (Walkin' Country Blues), alcoholism (Too Much Drinkin'), but also the flight from prevailing conditions, maybe with another perspective for life and the future in the big cities (Ticket for Chicago). But also themes of movement (Steam Train Blues) and the faith in God and Religion (If You've Got A Friend In Jesus) were made topics in the songs, as well as the occasional search for some recreation and a good time (Dance All Night Long). The social and personal problems found their way into the music and started to change the Blues on a profound level.

Track list:
 Walkin' Country Blues – 3.40
 Man Gone Missing – 4.40
 Can't Stay Blues – 4.58
 KKK Blues – 4.56
 Too Much Drinkin' – 4.52
 Catwalk Woman – 4.32
 If You've Got A Friend in Jesus – 4.24
 Head Out On The Highway – 4.32
 Wild Pony – 4.10
 Steam Train Blues – 3.50
 Going Up To Memphis – 4.20
 Somewhere Between Highway 61 & 49 – 6.06
 Ticket For Chicago – 5.16
 Dance All Night Long – 4.31

 Blue Guitars III – Louisiana & New Orleans 
When the originally African and South-influenced Blues were brought to Louisiana, New Orleans, the Mississippi Delta, new instruments were added— clarinet, brass, piano, mandolins, accordions – and along with the banjo mingled into an interesting mix, which would be known as New Orleans, Swamp, Cajun or Riverboat Blues. The basics for directions like Jazz, Swing and even Rock & Roll were laid during this time and a distinctive, instantly recognizable sound was created, which would imminently be associated with the Blues.

Track list:
 Two Days Missing Down The Viper Room – 2.56
 Who Cares If I Do – 4.23
 What Made Me Love You – 3.16
 You Got Dixie – 4.41
 One Night With You – 5.29
 Talking 'bout New Orleans – 5.27
 Le Fleur De La Vie – 3.13
 Catfish Girl – 3.50
 Only A Fool Plays By The Rules – 4.00
 Baby Come Home – 3.30
 Dance Avec Moi – 3.15
 L'ete Eternal – 3.31

 Blue Guitars IV – Electric Memphis Blues 
The Blues and Blues Musicians finally could make themselves heard among the loud crowds and stuffed places, they usually used to play. It was a tremendous change in the way, the Blues could be approached, fine and subtle figures and fine chord structures could suddenly be played, the Blues was rising to previously unbeknown heights: "Now I can play above the bar noise, Man I'm bigger than a crowd" as Rea states in the opener "Electric Guitar", which paraphrases what musicians must have felt after this milestone revolution. Nor did "electric" stop at the guitars – organs, pianos, keyboards, all was going electric, studios started to play around with the new electric sound, the possibilities seemed endless.

Track list:
 Electric Guitar – 4.42
 Electric Memphis Blues – 4.15
 All Night Long – 4.11
 Born Bad – 3.46
 Let's Start Again – 3.52
 What I'm Looking For – 4.26
 Rules Of Love – 3.12
 What You Done To Me – 3.28
 Hobo Love Blues – 3.38
 Pass Me By – 3.06
 The Soul Of My Father's Shadow – 3.52
 My Blue World Says Hello – 4.06

 Blue Guitars V – Texas Blues 
And yet another direction, the Blues was morphing into. Take the basic concept, move it into the "modern wild west" and what you get out of it is straightforward Texas Blues. It's all in there, endless highways, run-down trucker bars, oil, dirt, cowboy boots, stories about life on the move, all down in Texas, all just as sad as the original Blues (Lone Star Boogie, No Wheels Blues). The mixture of the basic Blues concept with more country and western styled instruments (slide guitars, harmonica) gave the Blues a rawer, yet again still instantly recognizable sound, which has played a major role in music ever since (up to Stevie Vaughan and ZZ Top).

"I still remember, the place we used to go, dreaming dreams of Texas, as we pushed hard through the snow" – Chris Rea

Track list:
 Lone Rider (Texas Blues) – 4.44
 Texas Blue – 5.10
 No Wheels Blues – 5.02
 Lone Star Boogie – 5.16
 Blind Willie – 6.48
 The American Way – 4.07
 Angellina – 4.47
 Truck Stop – 4.49
 Weekend Down Mexico – 4.20
 Texas Line Boogie – 4.41
 Too Big City – 5.02
 Houston Angel – 3.59

 Blue Guitars VI – Chicago Blues 
Again it was movement that was pushing the Blues into a new direction, movement upwards North to Chicago in the pursuit of jobs and a new life. People suddenly found themselves in a completely different situation and this instantly influenced the Blues, the electric style, developed earlier on in Electric Memphis and Texas Blues, remained, however became harder and edgier, instruments like the saxophone were incorporated into the music and gave this new hybrid a sometimes jazzy feel. Once again, the lyric themes shifted away from known territory and began to reflect the changed situation, drugs, alcohol, sex, women, money gained major importance, life in wintry ghettos and anonymous housing schemes contributed its share.

Track list:
 I'm Moving Up (Chicago Blues) – 4.30
 Maxwell Street – 4.39
 Bob Taylor – 5.15
 She's A Whole Heap Of Trouble – 2.30
 Jazzy Blue – 3.24
 Hip-Sway – 3.39
 That's The Way It Goes – 3.32
 To Get Your Love – 5.07
 Chicago Morning – 4.56
 Catwalk Woman – 3.35
 Since You've Been Gone – 4.09
 All Night Long – 5.27
 Here She Come Now – 4.14

 Blue Guitars VII – Blues Ballads 
With the incorporation of the piano and other new elements, such as swing and jazz, according to Chris Rea a somehow "sleepy morphine-induced style" came to be Blues Ballads. The original, primitive influences are no longer recognizable, replaced by a calmer, smoother, more polished, yet nonetheless still recognizable, style of Blues. All that constituted the Blues in the past is still there.

Track list:
 Last Call (Blues Ballads) – 3.41
 Maybe That's All I Need To Know – 4.28
 Deep Winter Blues – 5.09
 If I Ever Get Over You – 5.08
 I Love The Rain – 4.35
 My Soul Crying Out For You – 3.38
 If That's What You Want – 4.18
 There's No One Looking – 5.34
 What Became Of You – 4.54
 My Deep Blue Ways – 4.25

 Blue Guitars VIII – Gospel Soul Blues & Motown 
While the basic structures and rhythms of the Blues remained true to the original, still a new generation moved the Blues onwards, banjo style played on electric guitar became the electric "sitar", the sound hit the nerve of the Indy/Hippie generation, instantly recognizable - Tamla Motown. Softer and easier accessible than previous hybrids of the Blues.

Track list:
 Sweet Love – 4.25
 Break Another Piece Of My Heart – 4.39
 Ball & Chain – 5.08
 Gospel Trail – 5.05
 Shy Boy – 3.52
 Come Change My World – 4.15
 Call On Me – 4.10
 Just In Case You Never Knew – 4.29
 Let Me In – 5.52
 I’ll Be There For You – 4.18
 The Pain Of Loving You – 3.57
 Are You Ready – 6.08

 Blue Guitars IX – Celtic & Irish Blues 
The Blues went in yet another direction, when it started to mingle with Celtic and Scottish/Irish influences, forming still another hybrid. The general feeling of sadness, loss and blues, which is inherent in the Scottish, Irish and Celtic roots anyway, together with an all new instrumentation could lay the basis for a different kind of approach, giving the Blues the typical Celtic feel.

Track list: 
 Celtic Blue (Celtic And Irish Blues) – 8.11
 Too Far From Home – 7.28
 'Til The Morning Sun Shines On My Love And Me – 5.39
 Lucky Day – 5.16
 What She Really Is – 5.03
 Wishing Well – 4.11
 Irish Blues – 4.14
 No More Sorrow – 6.05
 While I Remain – 5.30
 Last Drink – 5.17
 'Til I Find My True Love's Name – 3.42
 Big White Door – 5.36

 Blue Guitars X – Latin Blues 
Latin Music may not be the most obvious direction to look for the Blues, still there were great influences from the African culture with slaves landing in Brazil, who influenced the Caribbeans from their own direction, Cuban guitar and some kind of trademark piano were added, creating a mix so different from Mississippi Blues, and yet, Bossa Nova Blues was a direction in its own right. The Blues was even swapping over into Reggae, but in spite of its "sunshine feeling" the themes and topics were just as sad.

Track list:
 Hey Gringo (Latin Blues) – 6.04
 Immigration Blues – 5.19
 Still Trying To Clear My Name – 4.26
 Sun Is Hot – 4.28
 Screw You And Your Deep Blue Sea – 4.43
 Nothing Seems To Matter No More – 3.55
 Sometimes – 5.00
 Lampiou – 5.46
 Keep On Dancing – 3.56
 Lucifer's Angel – 5.08
 How I Know It's You – 4.17
 Forever – 5.03
 You Got Soul – 5.27
 Bajan Blue – 4.57

 Blue Guitars XI – '60s and '70s 
A new time, a new generation, a new variation of the Blues. Things had started changing once again and once again, the whole 200-year-history of the Blues was thrown over in the split of a second, when Blues suddenly started to sound old again, respect was paid to the ancestors of modern Blues music, but there was also Woodstock, the Flower Power Movement, all those kinds of currencies that were interpreting the Blues in their own way and gave it a new face.

Track list:
 My Baby Told Me (Blues)(60s/70s) – 2.55
 Got To Be Moving – 4.03
 My Baby Told Me (Gospel) – 3.19
 Heartbreaker – 2.58
 Yes I Do (Instrumental) – 3.28
 Wasted Love – 4.44
 Cool Cool Blue – 4.15
 Clarkson Blues – 5.09
 Who Killed Love – 4.27
 Never Tie Me Down – 4.13
 Mindless – 3.55
 Ain't That Just The Prettiest Thing – 5.20
 Nobody But You – 3.55
 Waiting For Love – 4.57
 Blue Morning In The Rain – 4.50

 Dancing Down The Stony Road DVD 
This is a little add-on to the overall collection of music, some kind of making-of the Dancing Down the Stony Road album that Rea released in 2002, following the wake of his disease, his split with the record company and the process of coming to terms with his new style of music. The 75-minute DVD might be especially interesting to those who own the album; there are many interviews with Rea and the Band, a lot of footage from the writing and the recording sessions and a thorough depiction of the process of making an idea become reality.

 Personnel Musicians Chris Rea – acoustic piano, Hammond organ, harmonica, electric guitar, slide guitar, banjo, dobro, mandolin, bass, drums, percussion, calimba, balafon, vibraphone
 Ed Hession – accordion
 Robert Ahwai – guitar
 Gerry O'Connor – banjo
 Sylvin Marc – bass
 Martin Ditcham – drumsProduction'
Producers – Chris Rea and Andy Wilman
 Author – Chris Rea
 Narrator – Richard Williams
 Executive Producer – John Knowles
 Recording Engineer – Edward McDonald
 Mixing – Douglas Dreger
 Editing – Aiden Farrell and Chris Rodmell
 Director – Robert Payton
 Production Coordination – Janina Stamps
 Art Direction and Design – Jon Tricklebank
 Liner Notes – Mark Edwards
 Photography – Stuart Epps

Charts

References

External links
 Blue Guitars website at ChrisReaUSA
 The Blue Guitars Project (2005) at Blue Channel on YouTube

Chris Rea albums
2005 albums
Blues compilation albums
Country blues albums
New Orleans rhythm and blues albums
Electric blues albums
Texas blues albums
Chicago blues albums
Soul blues albums
Blues albums by English artists